Playback is the fourth album by the Luton-based hip hop group Phi Life Cypher. It mostly comprises new material, but also contains A-sides not released on previous Phi-Life Cypher albums ("Over", "Cypher Funk", "The Shining") and tracks from other artists which featured Phi-Life Cypher ("Cordless Mics at 20 Paces", "Distinguished Jamaican English", "Ghetto Rebels").

Track listing
 "Worldwide" 4.09
 "Cordless Mics at 20 Paces" 6.20
 "Distinguished Jamaican English" 3.35
 "Ill Force" 6.20
 "Showtime" 4.11
 "Cypher Funk" 3.47
 "The Shining" 3.46
 "A Time Of Chaos" 4.25
 "Ghetto Rebels" 5.36
 "Red Alert" 3.08
 "Knew Rulez" 3.43
 "All Alone" 4.33
 "My Verse First" 4.08
 "Over" 3.30
 "Exit" 1.38

2006 albums
Phi Life Cypher albums